Fourth of July Peak at  above sea level is a peak in the White Cloud Mountains of Idaho. The peak is located in Sawtooth National Recreation Area in Custer County  from Castle Peak, its line parent. It is the 201st highest peak in Idaho and rises to the west of Fourth of July and Washington lakes.

References 

Mountains of Custer County, Idaho
Mountains of Idaho
Sawtooth National Forest